The 2017 ICC World Cricket League East Asia-Pacific Region Qualifiers was an international cricket tournament that took place in Bendigo, Australia. The teams competing in the tournament are Vanuatu, Fiji, Indonesia, Japan, Philippines and Samoa. The winner of the qualifiers progressed to ICC WCL Division 5 which will be staged in September 2017.

Teams 
Six teams invited by ICC for the tournament:

Points table 

Source: Cricinfo

References 

2017–19 ICC World Cricket League
2017 in cricket